The Manne Building (also known as the M. Manne Building) is a historic commercial building located at Darlington, Darlington County, South Carolina.

Description and history 
It was built about 1892, and is a two-story commercial building with a flat roof. It features an elaborate pressed metal façade. The second floor exterior is characterized by 16 windows separated by paired Corinthian order pilasters. Above the second floor windows is pressed metal Eastlake ornamentation and includes a central pediment containing the name "M. Manne" and the date 1892.

It was listed on the National Register of Historic Places on February 10, 1988.

References

Commercial buildings on the National Register of Historic Places in South Carolina
Commercial buildings completed in 1892
Buildings and structures in Darlington County, South Carolina
National Register of Historic Places in Darlington County, South Carolina
Darlington, South Carolina